, in the Okinawan language, was the highest rank in the yukatchu aristocracy of the former Ryukyu Kingdom (modern-day Okinawa, Japan), though it was still below the aji nobility.

Ueekata rank was generally obtained as the last step in a progression from shii (子) rank to satonushi (里之子), then to peekumi (親雲上), and finally to ueekata. As with other Ryukyuan aristocratic titles, a member would often be referred to by their title, along with an associated placename. For example, royal government official Tei Dō (1549-1611) is equally well known by the title Jana Ueekata, or "ueekata of Jana," Jana (謝名) being an area (specifically, an azana) within what is today the city of Ginowan, Okinawa.

Holders of ueekata rank wore purple hachimachi headbands, the color being a symbol of rank.

Notes

References
"Ueekata." Okinawa konpakuto jiten (沖縄コンパクト事典, "Okinawa Compact Encyclopedia"). Ryukyu Shimpo (琉球新報). 1 March 2003. Accessed 5 January 2009.

 
Noble titles
Ryukyu Kingdom
Asian nobility